The 1981 Cleveland mayoral election took place on November 3, 1981, to elect the Mayor of Cleveland, Ohio. The election was officially nonpartisan, with the top two candidates from the September 29 primary advancing to the general election.

This was the first Cleveland mayoral election to a four-year term.

Primary election

General election

References

1980s in Cleveland
Cleveland mayoral
Cleveland
Mayoral elections in Cleveland
Non-partisan elections
November 1981 events in the United States